Pichaikkaaran is a 2016 Indian Tamil-language action thriller film written and directed by Sasi, produced by Fatima Vijay Antony and starring Vijay Antony and Satna Titus, with Bagavathi Perumal, Vazhakku En Muthuraman, and Dheepa Ramanujam in supporting roles. Antony also composed the music for the film. The story is about Arul (Vijay Antony), a billionaire businessman who leads a 48-day long secret life as a beggar as part of a religious offering to save his hopeless dying mother. The film was released on 4 March 2016.

The film was remade in Odia as Baby, in Marathi as Bhikari and in Kannada as Amma I Love You.

Plot 

Arul Selvakumar is a rich businessman based out of Palladam, Tirupur district. His mother, Bhuvaneshwari, is the person behind the growth of their textile business following her husband's early death. Avinashi is her brother-in-law who is money minded and has plans to grab Arul's properties. Arul returns from abroad after graduation and takes charge of all the businesses that were run by his mother. In the meantime, Bhuvaneshwari meets with an accident in the factory and falls into a coma. All the efforts taken by Arul for her treatment are in vain. By chance, he meets a sage at the hospital where his mother is being treated who tells him there is a way to save his mother; The sage advises him to live a 48-day life of a beggar with two conditions; the first being that he shouldn't reveal his real identity and the second being that he shouldn't inform anyone else of this. If he completes it, his mother will have a chance to survive.

With no other way to save his mother, Arul accepts both conditions and informs his friend Rajesh to look after the business until he returns. Arul travels to Chennai and joins other beggars at a temple, and starts begging. He comes across Magizhini and falls in love with her seeing her charitable personality. Arul recalls that he and his mother had initially decided to approach Magizhini for her hand in marriage through a matrimonial site. Magizhini also encounters Arul later and starts to like his character, not knowing that he is a beggar. Avinashi realises the absence of Arul and tries to take over Arul's business. In a wedding ceremony, Magizhini learns that Arul is a beggar and is angered, thinking Arul has misled her. She still doesn't avoid him as she is impressed more by his good nature. One day Magizhini's mother sees Arul's photo in her laptop and recalls that he is a rich businessman and also she had shared her photos with him through the matrimony website a few months ago. Magizhini is shocked and tries to meet Arul, where she overhears the conversation between Arul and Rajesh, which makes her realise Arul's life as a beggar is to save his mother, and she is impressed by his good nature. Rajesh urges Arul to return, but Arul refuses to come with him. Magizhini decides not to disturb Arul until his life as a beggar is still incomplete.

Meanwhile, a group of doctors who manage a mental health centre and use the patients for their medical experiments are found by Arul with the help of a beggar who stays there by pretending to be a mentally challenged girl. Knowing this, the doctors hire goons to murder Arul. Arul manages to escape from the goons. On his last day as a beggar, Arul is spotted by Avinashi, and he tries to kill him but accidentally stabs Magizhini, who is then admitted to the hospital. Arul, who is yet to complete his beggar life, is left hopeless as he is unable to pay the hospital expenses for Magizhini, but his beggar friends give him some money to help Arul while Avinashi is arrested by police. Arul gets back to his home after 48 days along with Rajesh to visit his mother and learns that there is no improvement in her health. Arul holds his mother's hands and prays for her recovery. Suddenly he feels his mother's hands moving. After six months, his mother completely recovers, and both Arul and Magizhini get married. In the climax, a beggar begs for money from Arul in front of a temple, but Arul, being busy with a phone call, fails to notice the beggar. Arul's mother gives alms to the beggar and tells Arul that the life of a beggar is so pathetic and they should never hurt them as people like themselves cannot lead a beggar's life even a single day, implying that Arul's mother is unaware of what Arul did.

Cast

Production 
Sasi began the production of Pichaikkaran in October 2014, and signed on Vijay Antony to feature in the lead role. The pair had earlier worked together in Dishyum (2006), in which Vijay Antony had composed the film's music. The team shot a schedule in Pollachi near Everwin Spinning Mills near Achipatty village in January 2015, before moving to Puducherry by June 2015.

Soundtrack 

The film's soundtrack album and background score were composed by Vijay Antony in his second collaboration with Sasi after Dishyum. The soundtrack album consists of seven tracks. The album was released on 7 January 2016. Behindwoods rated the album 2.25 out of 5 and noted that "Overall a pretty decent album but it does have a couple of thumping numbers!".

Telugu

Release

Critical reception 
Rediff wrote, "Sasi's Pichaikkaran may have overdosed on action and sentiment but the director manages to portray life from the other side. The humiliation and pain of people we meet and choose to ignore on a daily basis stays with you".

Hindustan Times wrote, "One of the biggest drawbacks of many Indian movies is its lethargic attitude towards perfecting a script – not drawing the line from one point to another with any fair degree of conviction. Pichaikkaran thus ends up as a beggar begging for credibility".

Moviecrow wrote "This Pichaikkaran is neither poor to beg nor rich to offer".

Behindwoods gave it a 3.25/5, saying that "Excessive exaggerations and lack of depth in the dealing make Pichaikkaran not an easy affair".

Indiaglitz gave it a 3.8/5, saying that "[It] makes the right impact as a wholesome entertainer with emotional scenes as his strong base".

Baradwaj Rangan of The Hindu called it "A not-bad drama marred by generic writing" in his review

Box office 
The movie brought in 16 crore in Tamil Nadu and 26.5 crore from the states of Andhra Pradesh and Telangana (under the title Bichagadu) which declared the film as blockbuster, which makes the worldwide gross collection almost 42.5 crore.

Sequel 
A sequel titled Pichaikkaran 2 was announced on 24 July 2020, which is scheduled to be released in 2021. Although the film was not yet released.

References

External links 
 

2016 films
2010s Tamil-language films
Indian action thriller films
2016 action thriller films
Films scored by Vijay Antony
Tamil films remade in other languages
Films directed by Sasi (director)